Pune Suburban Railway, (Marathi: पुणे उपनगरीय रेल्वे) also known as Pune Local, is a suburban rail system connecting Pune to its suburbs and neighboring villages in Pune District, Maharashtra. It is operated by Central Railway (CR), part of Indian Railways. The system operates on two routes, – and its part –. 18 trains operate on – route and 5 trains operate on – route. Also, DEMU trains operate on –– route.

History
The 9-car services were operated till March 2009, when 12-car services were introduced. 13 car trains are also operated.

Services

Stations

Note: Stations in Bold are origin / terminating stations

Pune–Lonavala service

Lonavala–Pune service

Pune–Talegaon service

Talegaon–Pune service

Pune–Daund–Baramati DEMU

This section was electrified in 2017, but is currently served by DEMUs only. Since March 2017, three DEMUs have started to operate on Pune–Daund route and one DEMU on Pune–Baramati route. Two DEMUs operate on Daund–Baramati route. There are plans to start EMU services on this section.

Stations

Proposed plans
According to the 2010-11 Budget, rail proposals were as follows:
 To build separate platforms for –/ services and increase the frequency to 30 min during peak hours and 45 min other time.
 Introduction of shuttle service on ––/ Sector. This will operate every 3 hours with 2/3 wagons for goods.
 Third track for – section. (Demand survey accepted in Budget 2011-12)
 To increase two terminals on – and – sections.
 To start suburban service on –Rajgurunagar station (Proposed) patch after completion of – , railway for connectivity with New Pune International Airport.

A new EMU terminal is proposed to be built on west of the existing station. It will have two lines and three platforms. This proposal includes:
 Extension of existing platforms to accommodate 24 bogie trains.
 A new terminal for EMU to accommodate 15 bogie trains.
 Three foot over-bridge to connect new terminal to other platforms.

See also 
Pune Metro
Pune BRTS
Pune

References

External links
Pune-Lonavala suburban train times
Lonavala-Pune suburban train times
Strengthen Lonavla-Daund rail corridor
Pune Lonavala Local
Lonavala to Pune Local

 
Year of establishment missing
Suburban rail in India
Pune railway division